Biohazard is a 1985 science-fiction horror film directed by Fred Olen Ray and starring Aldo Ray and Angelique Pettyjohn.

Cast

 Aldo Ray as General Randolph
 Angelique Pettyjohn as Lisa Martyn 
 William Fair as Mitchell Carter 
 David O'Hara as Reiger (as David Pearson) 
 Frank McDonald as Mike Hodgson 
 Art Payton as Dr. Williams (as Arthur Payton) 
 Charles Roth as Jack Murphy 
 Carroll Borland as Rula Murphy 
 Richard Hench as Roger 
 Loren Crabtree as Jenny 
 George Randall as Dumpster Man 
 Brad Arrington as Chambers 
 Ray Lawrence as Mayfield 
 Robert King as Sheriff Miller

External links
 

1985 films
1985 horror films
1980s science fiction horror films
American independent films
American science fiction horror films
1980s English-language films
Films directed by Fred Olen Ray
1980s monster movies
American monster movies
1985 independent films
1980s American films